Romea is a motor yacht built in 2015 by Abeking & Rasmussen.

History
In March of 2022, Forbes reported that Romea was still owned by Alexander Nesis. At 268 feet, she was registered in the Cayman Islands with a value of $110 million. On June 2, 2022, she was recorded in Göcek, Turkey. She was seen docked in Ayvalik, Turkey on July 6th 2022.
Seen leaving Fethiye on Sunday 24th July.

Design
Romea'''s exterior and interior were designed by Terence Disdale. The hull is built of steel and the superstructure is made of aluminium, with teak laid decks. The yacht is Lloyd's registered, issued by Cayman Islands.Romea is  longer than her sister ship Kibo.

Amenities
Among Romea's amenities are zero speed stabilizers, an elevator, a beach club, a grand piano, a swimming platform, an on-deck jacuzzi, a tender garage with tender, air conditioning, and underwater lights.

Performance
She is powered by twin 2,000 hp Caterpillar 3516-B diesel engines.

See also
 Kibo''
 Luxury yacht
 List of motor yachts by length
 List of yachts built by Abeking & Rasmussen

References 

2015 ships
Motor yachts